Hopewell Highway Infrastructure Limited (HHI), controlled by Hong Kong tycoon Gordon Wu, is the highway unit of Hong Kong-listed conglomerate Hopewell Holdings Ltd.

HHI has interests in two toll road projects in China, including the Guangzhou-Shenzhen Superhighway, which links the capital of the province of Guangdong to the Hong Kong-Shenzhen border, and another one that is due to be completed by 2004.

It also hopes to make a bid for a stake in a proposed giant bridge project,  Hong Kong-Zhuhai-Macau Bridge, linking Hong Kong to Macau and mainland China.

It raised HK$3.01 billion (US$385.9 million) from its IPO in early August, 2003.

See also
List of Hong Kong companies

References

External links
Hopewell Highway Infrastructure Limited

Companies listed on the Hong Kong Stock Exchange
Construction and civil engineering companies of Hong Kong
Transport in Hong Kong
Private road operators
Hopewell Holdings
Companies established in 2003